"Moondance" is a song recorded by Northern Irish singer and songwriter Van Morrison and is the title song on his third studio album Moondance (1970). It was written by Morrison, and produced by Morrison and Lewis Merenstein.

Morrison did not release the song as a single until September 1977, seven and a half years after the album was released. It debuted two months later where it reached #92, on the US Billboard Hot 100 and #91 on the US Cash Box Top 100 The single's B-side, "Cold Wind in August", had been released in the same year, on his latest album at the time, A Period of Transition.

"Moondance" is the song that Van Morrison plays most frequently in concert.

Composition and recording
"Moondance" was recorded at the Mastertone Studio  in New York City in August 1969, with Lewis Merenstein as producer.

The song is played mostly acoustic, anchored by a walking bass line (played on electric bass by John Klingberg), with accompaniment by piano, guitar, saxophones, and flute with the instruments played with a soft jazz swing. It's a song about autumn, the composer's  favourite season. Towards the end of the song, Morrison imitates a saxophone. The song also features a piano solo, played by Jef Labes, which is immediately followed by an alto saxophone solo by Jack Schroer. The song ends with a trill on the flute during the cadenza that fades out. Schroer's solo is often noted as one of the most influential saxophone solos in popular music. The scale used in Schroer's "Moondance" solo is A Aeolian (A, B, C, D, E, F, G) or could simply be considered as a C major scale and is played primarily over a D minor to A minor vamp that resolves via a sharp V (5 = F7) to natural V (5 = E79) dominant chord.

Music journalist Erik Hage wrote that the significance of the song "lies in its direct jazz approach", expanding that observation with "Astral Weeks had suggestions of jazz, but this song would take the genre head on. It would become Van Morrison's most successful and definitive jazz composition." Music critic Johnny Rogan described "Moondance" as a "celebration of nature," "expressed through a lovers' union in the night air."

"Moondance" was written and developed while Morrison was living in Cambridge, Massachusetts. He has commented, "With 'Moondance' I wrote the melody first. I played the melody on a soprano sax and I knew I had a song so I wrote lyrics to go with the melody. That's the way I wrote that one.  I don't really have any words to particularly describe the song, sophisticated is probably the word I'm looking for. For me, 'Moondance' is a sophisticated song.  Frank Sinatra wouldn't be out of place singing that."

The guitar player in his band at that time, John Sheldon, remembers that during the summer of 1968, at a rehearsal, the band was fooling around with a Broadway tune called “Lazy Afternoon” released in 1967 in a jazz version by Grant Green. Morrison requested some changes and began singing a melody that would eventually become "Moondance."

Other releases
"Moondance" as originally recorded on the album Moondance is one of the songs on the compilation album, The Best of Van Morrison, released in 1990 and also on the compilation album Still on Top – The Greatest Hits, released in 2007. Several live performances have been released by Morrison on albums over the years.
 
A medley with "My Funny Valentine" appears on the 1994 live double album A Night in San Francisco, a live be-bop influenced version of the song is on the 1996 album How Long Has This Been Going On, and is performed with Georgie Fame at the Ronnie Scott's Jazz Club. An edit of said version is also included on the 2007 compilation album The Best of Van Morrison Volume 3. Another live version appears on the  2006 limited edition CD Live at Austin City Limits Festival. A previously unreleased live recording of "Moondance", recorded at the Greek Theatre in 1986, with a recreation of The Caledonia Soul Orchestra is included on the 2007 compilation album, Van Morrison at the Movies - Soundtrack Hits.

"Moondance" was one of the songs performed on Morrison's first video Van Morrison in Ireland, released in 1981, and it also was performed as a medley with "Fever" for Morrison's second video Van Morrison The Concert, released in 1990. Morrison also released a live version of "Moondance" as the 10th song performed on the 1980 disc of Morrison's DVD released in 2006, Live At Montreux 1980/1974.

The subject of whether the melody of UB40's song Burden of Shame (from the 1980 album Signing Off) is based on Moondance has been debated. Morrison's name was, at one point, added to the list of the "many authors" of the song, but by 2010 it had vanished.

Critical response
The Allmusic reviewer describes "Moondance" as "one of those rare songs that manages to implant itself on the collective consciousness of popular music, passing into the hallowed territory of a standard, a classic."

Biographer John Collis praised the song for being more commercially accessible for most radio stations than a lot of his earlier work. He calls "Moondance" "an important song in the development of Morrison's career, since it indicated to radio station programmers a previously unsuspected versatility. Stations that would never have considered playing, say 'Slim Slow Slider' found that the smooth, jazzy sophistication of 'Moondance' was more to their taste."

"Moondance" was listed as #226 in Rolling Stone magazine's December 2004 feature "The 500 Greatest Songs of All Time". It is also one of The Rock and Roll Hall of Fame's 500 Songs that Shaped Rock and Roll.

In popular culture
"Moondance" is one of the moon-themed songs used in An American Werewolf in London,  a comedy-horror film released in 1981. It is heard during the sex scene between David Naughton (as David, the young man bitten by a werewolf) and Jenny Agutter (as Alex, his nurse and eventual girlfriend).

Personnel

 Van Morrison – vocals, guitar
 John Klingberg – bass guitar
 Jeff Labes – piano
 Gary Mallaber – drums
 John Platania – guitar
 Jack Schroer – alto saxophone
 Collin Tilton – tenor saxophone, flute

Covers
There have been many recorded versions of the song and it is also a very popularly performed instrumental band song.
"Moondance" is the opening tune on I Feel You, the 2011 album released by Herb Alpert and Lani Hall. Covers by Jonathan Rhys Meyers and Chris Botti were featured on the 2007 movie August Rush. Michael Bublé released a cover on his self-titled album in 2003. Ramsey Lewis and Nancy Wilson covered "Moondance" on the 2002 album Meant to Be. Other covers by notable musicians and entertainers include: Greg Brown, Georgie Fame, Kathie Lee Gifford, Ute Lemper and Will Martin.

References

Sources
Collis, John (1996). Inarticulate Speech of the Heart, Little Brown and Company, 
Hage, Erik (2009). The Words and Music of Van Morrison, Praeger Publishers, 
Heylin, Clinton (2003). Can You Feel the Silence? Van Morrison: A New Biography, Chicago Review Press, 
Hinton, Brian (1997). Celtic Crossroads: The Art of Van Morrison,  Sanctuary,

External links
 [ Allmusic Moondance Review]

1970 songs
1977 singles
Van Morrison songs
Songs written by Van Morrison
Nancy Wilson (jazz singer) songs
Warner Records singles
Songs about dancing
Song recordings produced by Lewis Merenstein
Song recordings produced by Van Morrison